The following is a list of county roads in Escambia County, Florida.  All county roads are maintained by the county in which they reside.

County roads

References

FDOT Map of Escambia County
FDOT GIS data, accessed January 2014

 
County